The 1937 Creighton Bluejays football team was an American football team that represented Creighton University as a member of the Missouri Valley Conference (MVC) during the 1937 college football season. In its third season under head coach Marchmont Schwartz, the team compiled a 2–7 record (1–3 against MVC opponents) and was outscored by a total of 141 to 45. The team played its home games at Creighton Stadium in Omaha, Nebraska.

Schedule

References

Creighton
Creighton Bluejays football seasons
Creighton Bluejays football